Nicholas Charles Tyrwhitt Wheeler  (born 20 January 1965) is an English businessman. In 1986, he established the Charles Tyrwhitt company and shirt brand, which he owns.

Life and career
Wheeler was born Ludlow, Shropshire and was educated at the Dragon School in Oxford and Eton College. At Eton, he was a classmate of former Prime Minister, Boris Johnson. After Eton, Wheeler attended the University of Bristol, where he studied geography. His first job was as a management consultant for Bain & Company.

In November 1986, he set up Charles Tyrwhitt, a shirt brand in the United Kingdom. It grew to be the UK’s largest mail order shirt business, and it also has several brick and mortar locations.

In 2008, he was a regional judge for the Entrepreneur Challenge in the UK.

Personal life 
Wheeler is married to Chrissie Rucker, founder of The White Company. They have four children: Tom, Ella, India and Bea. His sister, Susie Cummings, is founder and CEO of Nurole, the online head-hunting platform.

In 2010, Wheeler supported the Conservatives in the 2010 general election. He voted in favour of the UK's withdrawal from the European Union in 2016.

As of 2020, Wheeler and his wife's collective wealth was estimated at £427 million by the Sunday Times Rich List. They live in Tythrop Park in Buckinghamshire and also own a chalet in Klosters, Switzerland.

References 

1965 births
Living people
Alumni of the University of Bristol
English businesspeople in retailing
English company founders
Bain & Company employees
Officers of the Order of the British Empire
People educated at The Dragon School
People educated at Eton College
Businesspeople from Ludlow